"The Quest for Saint Aquin" is a science fiction short story by the American writer Anthony Boucher, originally published in 1951 in New Tales of Space and Time. "The Quest for Saint Aquin" was among the stories selected in 1970 by the Science Fiction Writers of America as one of the best science fiction short stories published before the creation of the Nebula Awards. As such, it was published in The Science Fiction Hall of Fame Volume One, 1929-1964.

Plot summary
In a post-apocalyptic technocratic future Earth, religion has been banned and the Catholic church has gone underground, relying on secret cells and symbols as in the days of the early church. The central character is a crypto-priest named Thomas who is charged by the secret pope with finding the resting place of a semi-legendary figure called Aquin (a hint to Saint Thomas of Aquin). Aquin had been an evangelist of great power who converted all those who listened to him preach, and his body supposedly never rotted after his death. The Pope believes that this miracle, if true, will be a powerful tool in winning new converts.

Thomas is provided with an intelligent multi-terrain transportation device called a robass ("robotic ass"), to assist him in reaching the area where Aquin's body supposedly rests. To his surprise, the vehicle is theologically literate and tries to persuade him to abandon his quest, arguing for example that he had not been asked to find Aquin, but rather to report that he had so that the pope could begin the process of canonization. Thomas resists the robass' persuasive arguments in the main, though he does succumb to the temptation to drink and carouse with a pretty half-Martian barmaid in a village. The villagers discover he is a priest, beat and rob him, leaving him for dead. He is ignored by all passers-by, but Abraham, an orthodox Jew, rescues him and nurses him back to health. He is able to return to his quest with the help of several secret believers in God. Various episodes from the New Testament are echoed as his quest continues.

Ultimately, Thomas does locate Aquin, only to find that he was a robot, and that therefore the legend of his incorruptibility was true...in a sense: his body could not possibly have decayed as he was never made of flesh. 

Stanislaw Lem comments on this religious quagmire as follows: The monk is enraged: you cannot help the victory of the truth with lies! The holy robot during his missionary work did pretend to be a human, and he even died because he decided not to visit a mechanic, so that not to reveal his robotic nature. Therefore the robot served the Truth to the people with the use of a lie.<ref>Stanislaw Lem, "Roboter in der Science Fiction" ["Robots in Science Fiction"], Quarber Merkur', 21, November 1969 </ref>

Notes
This story refers to the short story "Reason" by Isaac Asimov, about a robot on a space station that created a new religion and made itself into a prophet of a non-human creator.

See alsoThe Last Question'', by Isac Asimov, about an artificial super-intelligence which ultimately becomes the Godlike recreator of the Universe after its heat death.

References

Post-apocalyptic short stories
1951 short stories
Religion in science fiction
Works by Anthony Boucher